Where Is Coletti? is a 1913 German silent comedy film directed by Max Mack and starring Hans Junkermann, Madge Lessing, and Heinrich Peer. It was a major commercial hit on its release.

The film's sets were designed by Hermann Warm.

Cast
Hans Junkermann as Jean Coletti
Madge Lessing as Lolotte
Heinrich Peer as Anton
Anna Müller-Lincke as Resolute Dame
Hans Stock as Count Edgar
Max Laurence as old Count
Axel Breidahl

References

External links

Films of the German Empire
German silent feature films
Films directed by Max Mack
1910s chase films
German black-and-white films
German comedy films
1913 comedy films
Silent comedy films
Silent thriller films
1910s German films
Silent crime films